Yeshodhar Phanse is an Indian Shiv Sena politician from Mumbai.  He is a loyalist of the party. He is a three-time chairman of the standing committee of the Brihanmumbai Municipal Corporation (BMC), the municipal corporation of the city of Mumbai. He has held the position since April 2014. He first became corporator in 2002. He has held the position of chairman of health committee and became chairman of the development committee three times. From 2012 to 2014, he held the position of the leader of the house. He had also served as chairman of various BMC Committees such as Public Health Committee, Improvement Committee etc.

Positions held
 2002: First elected as corporator in Brihanmumbai Municipal Corporation 
 2005: Elected as Chairman of Public Health Committee Brihanmumbai Municipal Corporation
 2007: Elected as corporator in Brihanmumbai Municipal Corporation 
 2007: Elected as Chairman of Improvement Committee Brihanmumbai Municipal Corporation
 2012: Re-elected as corporator in Brihanmumbai Municipal Corporation 
 2012: Appointed as leader of the house
 2014: Elected as Standing Committee Chairman Brihanmumbai Municipal Corporation [1st term] 
 2015 : Re-elected as Standing Committee Chairman Brihanmumbai Municipal Corporation [2nd term] 
 2016 : Re-elected as Standing Committee Chairman Brihanmumbai Municipal Corporation [3rd term]

References

External links
 Shiv Sena Home Page

Living people
Shiv Sena politicians
People from Maharashtra
Marathi politicians
Maharashtra municipal councillors
Politicians from Mumbai
1962 births